Ancistrus temminckii is a species of armoured suckermouth catfish in the family Loricariidae of order Siluriformes.  It is found in Suriname in the Saramacca River, Suriname River and Maroni River basins.  Males grow to about  excluding tail. It is very rarely imported these days, however individuals of the so-called Ancistrus cf. cirrhosus, a fish of which the origin is unknown, are often sold as A. temminckii. The difference between the two species is that the A. temminckii has a dark spot at the base of its dorsal fin, between the first and the second ray.

References

temminckii
Taxa named by Achille Valenciennes
Fish described in 1840